Statistics of Belgian First Division in the 1956–57 season.

Overview

It was contested by 16 teams, and Royal Antwerp FC won the championship.

League standings

Results

References

Belgian Pro League seasons
1956–57 in Belgian football
Belgian